Muansa is an afrotropical genus of cicadas.

References

Taxa named by William Lucas Distant
Cicadidae genera
Platypleurini